Ding is a Chinese family name. It consists of only 2 strokes. The only two characters that have fewer strokes are "一" and "乙".

Distribution
In 2019 it was the 48th most common surname in Mainland China.

Origins
There are four main hypothesized sources of Ding:

The earliest record of this surname in history was the Duke of Ding during the Shang Dynasty.
The name derived from the ancestral surname Jiang. Duke Ding of Qi was the second recorded ruler of the State of Qi. After his death, his descendants adopted his posthumous name Ding as their clan name in his honor. 
During Spring and Autumn period, the descendants of Duke Ding of Song also used Ding as their last name. 
During the Three Kingdoms period, a general, Sun Kuang of the Wu kingdom, accidentally burnt the food supply and as a punishment, the king Sun Quan ordered this general to change his last name to Ding; the king did not want to bear the same last name as the general.

The Ding hometown is supposedly northwest of Dingtao (定陶), Shandong.

Hui ethnic group

Among the Hui Muslims, the surname Ding is thought to originate from the last syllable of the Arabic honorific "ud-Din" or "al-Din" (as in, for example, the name of the Bukharan Muslim Sayyid Ajjal Shams ud-Din (1210–1279; also spelled al-Din), who was appointed Governor of Yunnan by the Mongol Yuan dynasty).

In particular, descent from Sayyid Ajjal Shams ud-Din, known in Chinese as Saidianchi Shansiding (赛典赤赡思丁), is attested in the Ding lineage of Chendai, near Quanzhou, Fujian.

Although some do not practise Islam, the Ding clan remains as one of the better-known Hui clans around Quanzhou, Fujian that still identify as Muslim. These Hui clans merely require descent form Arab, Persian, or other Muslim forebears, and they need not be Muslim. Due to their historical ancestors' religion, it is considered a taboo offer pork to ancestors of the Ding family; the living Ding family members themselves consume pork nonetheless.

One branch of this Ding (Ting) family descended from Sayyid Ajjal Shams al-Din Omar resides in Taisi Township, Yunlin County, Taiwan. They trace their descent through him via the Ding family from Quanzhou, Fujian. Although they feigned to be Han Chinese while in Fujian, they practised Islam when they originally arrived in Taiwan in the 1800s, soon thereafter building a mosque. In time, all their descendants have eventually converted to Buddhism or Taoism and the mosque built by the Ding family is currently a Taoist Temple.

The Ding family also has branches in the Philippines, Indonesia, Malaysia, and Singapore among the diaspora Chinese communities there but no longer practise Islam; some maintain their Hui identity.

A Hui legend in Ningxia links four surnames common in the region — Na, Su, La, and Ding — with the descendants of Shams al-Din's son, Nasruddin, who "divided" their ancestor's name (in Chinese, Nasulading) among themselves.

Other Romanizations 
 Ting, used in Taiwan, Hong Kong, and the Philippines
 Đinh (Dinh), used in Vietnam
 Chung or Jeong, used in Korea

Notable people 
 Ding Chao (1883–1950s), military general 
 Ding Feng (died 271), military general
 Ding Haichun (born 1954), vice admiral, deputy political commissar of the PLA Navy
 Ding Junhui (born 1987), snooker player
 Ding Kuiling (born 1966), chemist
 Ding Kung-wha (born 1953), Chairperson of Financial Supervisory Commission of the Republic of China (2016)
 Ding Laihang (born 1957), Commander of the PLA Air Force
 Ding Lei (born 1971), founder of NetEase
 Ding Ling (1904–1986), author
 Ding Liren (born 1992), chess grandmaster
 Ding Liang (丁亮) (born 1984), professor of nutrition studies at Harvard university
 Ding Ning (born 1990), table tennis player
 Ding Wei (born 1979), go player
 Ding Yanyuhang (born 1993), Chinese basketball player
 Ding Yixin (born 1991), women's grandmaster at chess
 Ding Zilin, Professor, currently the leader of the political pressure group Tiananmen Mothers.
 Samuel C. C. Ting (born 1936), Nobel Prize laureates in Physics, 1976.
 K. H. Ting (1915–2012), bishop and former Protestant leader in China
 Ding Richang (1813–1882), late Qing dynasty official, Governor of Jiangsu and Fujian
 Ding Ruchang (1836–1895), late Qing dynasty admiral in the First Sino-Japanese War
 Ding Sheng (1913–1999), general, Governor of Guangdong
 Ding Shisun (1927–2019), President of Peking University
 Ding Xieping (1938–2020), mathematician
 Ding Yi (born 1959), vice admiral, deputy commander of the PLA Navy
 Ding Yi (1927–2019), founder of Dongfang Electric
 Ding Yiping (born 1951), vice admiral, former deputy commander of the PLA Navy
 Chung Il-kwon (丁一權 정일권) (1917–1994), South Korean military general.
 Ding Chengxin (丁程鑫) (born 2002), singer and actor

Fictional characters 
 Ding Hai, from the Hong Kong television series The Greed of Man
 Ding Lik, from the Hong Kong television series The Bund
 Ding Yau Kin, from the Hong Kong television series Looking Back in Anger
 Ding Yau Hong, from the Hong Kong television series Looking Back in Anger

Other Surnames 
 The surname Chen can also be romanised as Ding or Ting from its Eastern Min pronunciation.

References 

Chinese-language surnames
Individual Chinese surnames